Bahan may refer to:

 Bahan, Burma
 Bahan, Iran
 Bahan, Israel